Richard Wolstencroft (born April 23, 1969) is an Australian filmmaker and director of the Melbourne Underground Film Festival or MUFF. Wolstencroft also founded the Melbourne BDSM venue Hellfire Club under the pseudonym 'Richard Masters.'

Career
Wolstencroft's film career began in 1992, with the premier of his directorial debut, the vampire film Bloodlust, which he co-directed with Jon Hewitt. In the same year, Wolstencroft opened Hellfire Club, the only BDSM and kink venue operating in Melbourne for the greater part of the 1990s.

In 1999, Wolstencroft released his second feature film Pearls Before Swine. The rejection of that film by Melbourne International Film Festival prompted Wolstencroft to start the Melbourne Underground Film Festival as an outlet "dedicated to alternative, exploitation, genre and political cinema" in 2000.

Wolstencroft directed and released three other feature-length projects, The Beautiful and Damned in 2008, The Second Coming in 2015, and The Second Coming: Volume 2 in 2016.

Wolstencroft continues to serve as director of the MUFF as of 2022.

Controversy & legal issues
Wolstencroft's first film-related legal issue came in 2001, when MUFF was forced to cancel a screening of Salò, or the 120 Days of Sodom due to being unable to obtain permission from the Australian Classification Board to screen the film.

In 2003, Wolstencroft scheduled a screening of a lecture by noted Holocaust denier David Irving as part of the annual MUFF programming. Although Australian Jewish groups failed to secure a court injunction to prevent the screening, the recording was pulled from the MUFF schedule by Wolstencroft hours before it was slated to be shown.

In 2010, Wolstencroft organized an illegal screening of the film L.A. Zombie. After being brought to trial for the illegal screening, Wolstencroft was ultimately ordered by the Melbourne Magistrates' Court to pay $750 to the Royal Children’s Hospital, although the screening was eligible for penalties as severe as a $20,000 fine and up to two years in prison. After the screening took place, Wolstonecroft's home was raided by Australian police.

In 2017, Wolstencroft uploaded a post to Facebook negatively reacting to Australia's marriage equality vote, claiming that "[h]omosexuality is created often by child abuse" and that "[t]he Australian public really was fooled, bullied and cajoled in to [sic] this decision ruthlessly by the Government and Media Elite." An ensuing backlash led to Wolstencroft publicly apologizing for the post and implying he would resign as director of the MUFF, only to return to the festival in his original position the following year.

Critical reception
After release, Bloodlust was reviewed in Australian film magazine Cinema Papers by critic Karl Quinn, who described the movie as "appalling, plot-less, badly directed, scripted and acted."

Mark David Ryan, associate professor of film and screen at the Queensland University of Technology described Wolstencroft as a "key [figure] in 2000s horror production" and described Bloodlust as "one of the more renowned underground horrors of the decade."

Critic Adrian Martin described Pearls Before Swine as "grandly pretentious" and "an incoherent, idiotic, excruciatingly bad film that revels in the kind of fascism espoused by naughty schoolboys."

Wolstencroft's documentary The Last Days of Joe Blow was reviewed by SBS film critic Simon Foster, who awarded the film a three-and-a-half star rating and described the film as both "[a] jittery, impulsive work" and "a revealing, incisive account of a man at the crossroads."

Politics
Wolstencroft supported the Sex Party in the 2010 Victorian state elections, speaking at a launch event for the party.

Filmography
 Bloodlust
 The Intruder
 Pearls Before Swine
 The Beautiful and Damned
 The Last Days of Joe Blow
 The Second Coming
 The Second Coming (Vol. 2)

References 

1969 births
Living people
Film directors from Melbourne
BDSM people